"Domo23" is a song by American hip hop recording artist Tyler, the Creator. It was released on February 14, 2013, as the first single from his third studio album Wolf (2013). The song peaked at number 2 on the Billboard Bubbling Under Hot 100 Singles and number 37 on the Billboard Hot R&B/Hip-Hop Songs chart.

Background
On February 14, 2013, Odd Future uploaded a video to their YouTube account, which included L-Boy skydiving and stating that Wolf would be released on April 2, 2013, later that day Tyler stated on his Twitter account that he would be releasing a new song along with an accompanying music video.

Music video
The music video was released on February 14, 2013. In it, Tyler plays a wrestler named Fookie Bookie with blond dreads and metallic spandex, taking on his fellow Odd Future member Domo Genesis in the clip. Tyler ends up defeating Domo. The video then cuts to the song "Bimmer". The video featured cameos from Odd Future members Earl Sweatshirt, Jasper Dolphin and Taco Bennett.

Live performances
On February 26, 2013, Tyler, the Creator performed the song on Late Night with Jimmy Fallon along with "Treehome95".

Track listing

Charts

Release history

References

2013 singles
Tyler, the Creator songs
2013 songs
Songs written by Tyler, the Creator